Since 1909, the Conservatives had held the mayor's position in Frederiksberg Municipality. . This was despite the red bloc often having success in the municipality for Danish general elections. In example, it was the municipality where the bloc received their 8th highest percentage of votes in 2019.

In the 2017 election, the red bloc and blue bloc had sat in opposite electoral alliances, and only 272 votes had split the 25th seat, handing the seat to the electoral alliance of the blue bloc. Following this, Jørgen Glenthøj from the Conservatives would win his third term.

In 2019, Jørgen Glenthøj stepped down as mayor, citing he wanted to spend more time with his family. Simon Aggesen from the same party would take over.

Due to the close result in the previous election and the fact that Frederiksberg Municipality was the municipality with the highest number of first-time voters, this election was seen as one of the most exciting one's of the 2017 Danish local elections.

For this election, the council would increase from 25 to 29 seats, being the only municipality in the 2017 Danish local elections to change their number of seats.

The result would see the Conservatives once again become the biggest party. However, for the first time in 112 years, it seemed as though they might lose the mayor's position. The traditional red bloc had won 15 seats and a majority. Only 416 votes had separated the two electoral alliances, in which the two blocs once again had entered. The Red–Green Alliance had become the biggest party of the red bloc, but it would be Michael Vindfeldt from the Social Democrats, who would become the new mayor, after an agreement was reached between themselves, the Danish Social Liberal Party, the Green Left and Red–Green Alliance. This would mark the first time in 112 years that the Conservatives would not hold the mayor's position of the municipality.

Electoral system
For elections to Danish municipalities, a number varying from 9 to 31 are chosen to be elected to the municipal council. The seats are then allocated using the D'Hondt method and a closed list proportional representation.
Frederiksberg Municipality had 29 seats in 2021

Unlike in Danish General Elections, in elections to municipal councils, electoral alliances are allowed.

Electoral alliances 

Electoral Alliance 1

Electoral Alliance 2

Results

Notes

References 

Frederiksberg